Barfoed is a Danish surname. Notable people with the surname include:

Christen Thomsen Barfoed (1815–1899), Danish chemist 
Kasper Barfoed (born 1972), Danish film director
Lars Barfoed (born 1957), Danish politician

Danish-language surnames